E. maxima may refer to:

 Ecklonia maxima, a brown algae
 Eimeria maxima, an apicomplexan parasite
 Elachista maxima, a European moth
 Entophlyctis maxima, a primitive fungus
 Euphaedra maxima, an African butterfly